Lombardy (Lombardia, Lombardia storega or Granda Lombardia in Lombard), also called Historical Lombardy or Great Lombardy, is a toponym referring to the historical region, greater than the modern Italian administrative region, which culturally, linguistically and politically has been historically considered Lombard.

Lombardy was once used to indicate the whole Gallo-Romance speaking area in nowadays Northern Italy, deriving from the word Langobardia (Langobardia Maior in the case of the North), the Latin name for the Italian territories conquered by the ancient Lombards.

Over time, the definition of Lombardy shrank: Dante Alighieri, in his De vulgari eloquentia, recognised the autonomy of Romagna and Genoa from Lombardy. Since the 1400s Piedmont became more and more culturally autonomous from the rest of Lombardy, and by the 1600s there was basically the partition between Lombardy and Piedmont, owned by the House of Savoy.

References

History of Lombardy